The East Germany women's national under-20 volleyball team represents East Germany in international women's volleyball competitions and friendly matches under the age 20 and it was ruled by the East German Volleyball Federation That was a member of The Federation of International Volleyball FIVB and also a part of The European Volleyball Confederation CEV.

Results

FIVB U20 World Championship
 Champions   Runners up   Third place   Fourth place

Europe U19 Championship
 Champions   Runners up   Third place   Fourth place

Team

Current squad

References

External links
Official website
FIVB profile

National women's under-20 volleyball teams
Volleyball in East Germany